A list of animated television series first aired in 2008.

See also
 List of animated feature films of 2008
 List of Japanese animation television series of 2008

References

Television series
Animated series
2008
2008
2008-related lists